The Federal Deposit Insurance Act of 1950, is a statute that governs the Federal Deposit Insurance Corporation (FDIC). The FDIC was originally created by the Banking Act of 1933, which amended the Federal Reserve Act of 1913.

External links 
 Federal Deposit Insurance Act as amended (PDF/details) in the GPO Statute Compilations collection
 Public Law 81-797, 81st Congress, S. 2822: An Act to Amend the Federal Deposit Insurance Act

Federal Deposit Insurance Corporation